Sergio De Gregorio (24 February 1946 – 28 January 1966) was an Italian freestyle swimmer. He competed in three events at the 1964 Summer Olympics. He died in the Lufthansa Flight 005 plane crash in Bremen, Germany.

References

External links
 

1946 births
1966 deaths
Italian male freestyle swimmers
Olympic swimmers of Italy
Swimmers from Rome
Swimmers at the 1964 Summer Olympics
Victims of aviation accidents or incidents in Germany
Victims of aviation accidents or incidents in 1966
20th-century Italian people